The Tea Rose Stakes is an Australian Turf Club Group 2 Thoroughbred horse race, for three-year-old fillies, at set weights, over a distance of 1400 metres, held annually at Randwick Racecourse, Sydney, Australia in September. Total prize money for the race is A$250,000.

History
The Tea Rose Stakes is part of the Princess Series of races which also includes the Silver Shadow Stakes, Furious Stakes, and Flight Stakes.

Distance
 1980–1984 - 1400 metres
 1985–1990 - 1500 metres
 1991 - 1550 metres
 1992–2012 - 1500 metres
 2013 onwards - 1400 metres

Venue
 1980–1990 - Rosehill Gardens Racecourse
 1991 - Canterbury Park Racecourse 
 1992–2011 - Rosehill Gardens Racecourse
 2012 onwards - Randwick Racecourse

Grade
 1980–1982 - Listed Race
 1983–1984 - Group 3
 1985 onwards - Group 2

Winners

 2022 - Zougotcha
 2021 - Four Moves Ahead
 2020 - Dame Giselle
 2019 - Funstar
 2018 - Miss Fabulass
 2017 - Alizee
 2016 - Foxplay
 2015 - Pearls
 2014 - First Seal
 2013 - Guelph
 2012 - Longport
 2011 - Streama
 2010 - More Strawberries
 2009 - More Joyous
 2008 - Samantha Miss
 2007 - †race not held
 2006 - Cheeky Choice
 2005 - Mnemosyne
 2004 - Prisoner Of Love
 2003 - Shamekha
 2002 - Victory Vein
 2001 - Ha Ha
 2000 - Unworldly
 1999 - Danglissa
 1998 - Sunline
 1997 - Stella Cadente
 1996 - Assertive Lass
 1995 - Pontal Lass
 1994 - Danarani
 1993 - Angst
 1992 - Burst
 1991 - Bold Promise
 1990 - Whisked
 1989 - Tristanagh
 1988 - Glenview
 1987 - Glory Girl
 1986 - Evandale Star
 1985 - Shinikima
 1984 - Premier Flight
 1983 - Sabre Dancer
 1982 - Emancipation
 1981 - Black Shoes
 1980 - Dark Eclipse

† Not held because of outbreak of equine influenza

See also
 List of Australian Group races
 Group races

References

Horse races in Australia